Lawrence Harvey (31 January 1876  – 30 October 1953) was a Scotland international rugby union player

Rugby Union career

Amateur career
Harvey played for Greenock Wanderers.

Provincial career
He was capped by Glasgow District in 1898; scoring a try in the  Inter-City match against Edinburgh District.

International career
He was capped once for the Scotland international side, turning out against Ireland in 1899.

References

1876 births
1953 deaths
Scottish rugby union players
Rugby union players from Glasgow
Glasgow District (rugby union) players
Greenock Wanderers RFC players
Scotland international rugby union players
Rugby union forwards